Achaea serva is a species of noctuid moth of the family Erebidae first described by Johan Christian Fabricius in 1775. It is found from the Indo-Australian tropics of India, Sri Lanka, Myanmar, China, Borneo, Hong Kong, Java, the Philippines, the New Hebrides, to Okinawa, many western Micronesian islands and New Guinea and Australia.

Description
This species has a wingspan of 70–82 mm for the males and 62–80 mm for the females. Pale medial band on hindwing is less prominent. The forewing underside is more diffusely marked and less strongly variegated, but has a discal lunule. Caterpillars are brown. First pair of prolegs is atrophied, so they move in a looper fashion. Tail consists of a small pair of horns.

Ecology
Recorded larval food plants include Buchanania, Ipomoea, Diospyros, Rosa, Sapindus, Madhuca, Manilkara, Mimusops, Palaquium, Sideroxylon, Excoecaria agallocha, Ricinus communis and Acacia auriculiformis.

Subspecies
Achaea serva serva
Achaea serva fuscosuffusa (New Guinea)

Gallery

References

Achaea (moth)
Moths described in 1775
Moths of Asia
Moths of Australia
Taxa named by Johan Christian Fabricius